Santa Maria de Taüll is a Romanesque church situated in the territory of Vall de Boí, a commune in the valley with the same name and Comarca of Alta Ribagorça in the north of Province of Lleida and the autonomous communities of Catalonia in Spain.

History 
Like Sant Climent, Taüll, Sant Joan de Boí, Santa Eulàlia d'Erill la Vall or Sant Feliu de Barruera, the date of construction of Santa Maria is believed to be in 11th century.

In November 2000, it was included in the world heritage site of UNESCO with eight other Catalan Romanesque Churches of the Vall de Boí.

Architecture

Wall Paintings

Antependium

References 

Climent de Taull
Romanesque architecture in Catalonia
Catalan art
Alta Ribagorça
World Heritage Sites in Catalonia
Vall de Boí